Barbie Riding Club is a 1998 computer game developed by American studio Human Code and published by Mattel Media. Its gameplay involves feeding, grooming and riding horses.

Reception 

In the United States, Barbie Riding Club took #1 on PC Data's computer game sales rankings in its opening week. It debuted on the monthly charts in second place for November 1998, a position it held in December. By the end of the year, its sales in the United States had totaled 288,381 units, for revenues to $9 million. This made it the country's 14th-best-selling computer game of 1998, according to PC Data.

References 

1998 video games
Barbie video games
Horse-related video games
Software for children
Video games featuring female protagonists
Children's educational video games
Windows games
Classic Mac OS games
Video games developed in the United States
Mattel video games